Martins Azubuike  is a Nigerian politician who served as the 5th Speaker of the Abia State House of Assembly after he was elected on June 11, 2015. He had previously served as a Member of the House, representing Isiala Ngwa North Constituency. He was succeeded as Speaker by Kennedy Njoku following his impeachment by members of the House.

References

Igbo politicians
Living people
People from Abia State
Year of birth missing (living people)